Saaho is a 2019 Indian action thriller film that was written and directed by Sujeeth, and produced by UV Creations. It stars Prabhas in the title role, and an ensemble cast of Shraddha Kapoor, Chunky Pandey, Jackie Shroff, Arun Vijay, Neil Nitin Mukesh, Lal, Murali Sharma, Mandira Bedi, Mahesh Manjrekar, Prakash Belawadi, Tinnu Anand, Evelyn Sharma, Supreeth, Devan, and Vennela Kishore. Saaho was simultaneously made in Telugu and Hindi, and is the Hindi-film debut of Prabhas and the Telugu-film debut of Shraddha Kapoor. The film follows two covert operatives who are searching for a thief who has stolen  (US$284 million). Soon, they realise the case is linked to the death of a prominent business tycoon and an emerging gang war for the control of a megalopolis.

Principal photography for Saaho began in August 2017. Filming took place in India, the United Arab Emirates, Romania and Austria. The film's soundtrack was released by T-Series. Saaho was released in India in regular and IMAX theatres on 30 August 2019. The film received mixed to negative reviews from critics, who praised the cast performances, visual effects, cinematography and action sequences but criticised the screenplay, direction and length. Saaho grossed – worldwide against its budget of ₹350 crore ($50 million). The film flopped at the box office except the Hindi version which became commercially successful.

Plot 
Narantak Roy is a powerful, influential businessman who leads Roy Group, a corporate company that governs Waaji City, a fictional metropolitan city. When Roy visits Mumbai for a business deal, he is killed in a deliberate car crash. Devaraj, the son of Roy's friend, business partner and mentor Pruthviraj, plans to declare himself the next leader of Waaji City. Ibrahim, Roy's most-trusted secretary, tells Kalki, the legal advisor of Roy Group, Roy's family has been dead for decades and that he had been hiding a secret – that he had a son named Vishwank Roy – for 25 years. Vishwank foils Devaraj's plans by succeeding his father as the city's leader. Vishwank is determined to discover the identity of his father's murderer.

In Mumbai, a master thief steals  ($284 million) with ease. The culprit proves difficult to identify because he used random, unrelated people who were unaware they were assisting in a robbery, to steal the money; and a nationwide search ensues. Ashok Chakravarthy, a secret agent, is assigned to lead the search with the help of crime branch officers Amritha Nair, Goswami, and David. They uncover a thief named Jai, whom Ashok meets in a bar. Ashok discloses to Jai the information on a black box – the key to the locker in Waaji City holding  ($284 million) of all of the board members of Roy Group. On Vishwank's orders, Kalki travels to Mumbai, retrieves the black box, and deposits it in a bank.

During these incidents, Amritha and Ashok fall in love. After an intense chase to catch Jai stealing the box, Amritha, Ashok and David – the team's cyber-intelligence officer – confront Jai. However, It is revealed Jai is really the covert operative Ashok Chakravarthy. The lead officer who had been with the team is actually Saaho, who is the thief. Saaho escapes with his partner David, who helped him disguise his identity during the operation. It is revealed Devaraj killed Roy to usurp control of the city. Amritha, working as a double agent, tracks Saaho and pretends to be in love with him, and wants a share in the stolen money. Amritha falls in love with Saaho and she betrays Ashok.

Devaraj shoots and kidnaps Amritha, forcing Saaho to give Devaraj the black box. Saaho, however, deceives Devaraj and gives the black box to Vishwank in return for Amritha's safety. Saaho destroys Devaraj's building and steals the money in Devaraj's lockers. Ashok and the police chase Saaho with a sniper in a helicopter and a person in a jet pack. Saaho overpowers his opponent. Amritha, also in the helicopter, tries to save Saaho by distracting the sniper, who pushes her into danger. Saaho saves Amritha with a jet pack but is arrested. Kalki is revealed to be on Devaraj's side; she opens the vault with Vishwank's fingerprint and the black box; instead of money, she finds pictures of Roy and his son. Saaho battles and defeats Devaraj's goons in Karana village, which Roy had previously protected.

Devaraj arrives. Saaho declares himself to be Siddhanth Nandan Saaho, Roy's real son who disguised himself to seek vengeance for Roy's death. Kalki is shocked after seeing the portrait of Roy and Saaho. Saaho kills Devaraj, Shinde, Prince and Kalki. Ibrahim reveals to Roy Group board members Vishwank was not Roy's son but Ibrahim's son; his real name is Iqbal and he was brought in to save Roy's throne until Saaho returns to claim it and kill his father's murderers. Ibrahim reveals Saaho's real identity to the board members, and Saaho becomes the ruler of Waaji City and CEO of Roy Group. Months later, Saaho locates Amritha in Innsbruck, Austria, and proposes to her, which she accepts. An assassin aims at Saaho to kill him. Saaho opens his eyes, aware of the danger in the distance.

Cast 

 Prabhas as Siddhanth Nandan Saaho / Ashok Chakravarthy
Karthikeya Krishna as Saaho, six years old
Suman as Saaho, thirteen years old
 Shraddha Kapoor as Amritha Nair (Ammu), Saaho's love interest
 Jackie Shroff as Narantak Roy
 Arun Vijay as Vishwank Roy / Iqbal, Ibrahim's son
Joy as Vishwank, thirteen years old
 Chunky Pandey as Devaraj
 Neil Nitin Mukesh as Jai / Ashok Chakravarthy
 Lal as Ibrahim
 Murali Sharma as David
 Prakash Belawadi as Shinde IPS
 Mahesh Manjrekar as Prince
 Vennela Kishore as Goswami 
 Tanikella Bharani as Indian External Affairs Minister Ramaswamy 
 Mandira Bedi as Kalki Gopalacharya
 Supreeth as Alex Fernandes
 Evelyn Sharma as Jennifer
 Devan as Devan Varma, Inspector-general of police 
 Tinnu Anand as Pruthviraj
 Ravi Varma as Ajay
 Sharath Lohitashwa as Mani
 Duvvasi Mohan as a Sub-Police Inspector
 Abhay Bethiganti as assistant manager
 Shyraa Roy as Natasha
 Harsha Vardhan as Shinde's assistant
 Damini Chopra as Preethi
 Khaleel as bodyguard  
 Jacqueline Fernandez as a go-go dancer (cameo appearance in the item song "Bad Boy")

Production 
Principal photography began in August 2017. It stars Prabhas and Shraddha Kapoor in the lead roles, and the supporting cast includes Arun Vijay, Jackie Shroff, Lal, Neil Nitin Mukesh and Mandira Bedi. A large part of the budget was spent filming the action scenes. International stunt coordinator Kenny Bates was brought in to choreograph the action scenes. Arun Vijay grew out his hair to portray his character in Saaho.

Saaho was simultaneously filmed in Telugu and Hindi, and many important scenes were planned to be filmed in Tamil; the scenes acted by Sharath Lohithaswa were re-filmed in Tamil. Saaho is Prabhas' debut in Hindi cinema and Kapoor's debut in Telugu cinema. Kapoor's scenes were only filmed in Telugu and Hindi.

The film's first filming schedule, which was in Hyderabad, was completed by October 2017. The second schedule began in December 2017 at Ramoji Film City; according to the film's producers, Shraddha Kapoor's action sequences in the film were made with heavy weaponry. After a few days, filming shifted to Dubai for a month; some of the major action sequences were filmed in Dubai with Prabhas and Neil Nitin Mukesh, while Shraddha Kapoor switched to her next project Stree. After filming half of Saaho in Hyderabad, Mumbai and Dubai, the cast and crew began the fourth schedule in Abu Dhabi in February 2018, which ended within a few weeks. The fifth schedule, also in Abu Dhabi, started in late February and the sixth schedule began in mid-March in Dubai and Romania. The final leg of film and its romantic songs were filmed in Innsbruck and the Tyrol region of Austria.

An action sequence that features in an exceptionally long period of the screenplay was extensively filmed near the Burj Khalifa; 25 crores from the budget had been spent. Prabhas underwent rigorous training that involved cardiovascular and weight training, and plyometric obstacle races. Prabhas praised his co-star Shraddha Kapoor, stating she was the best choice for her strong character. Prabhas' character is grey-shaded. Prabhas plays a police officer.

Saaho includes some underwater sequences with Prabhas, who learnt scuba diving in preparation for his role. Prabhas dubbed his own lines in the Hindi version while a professional dubbing artist was hired for Shraddha Kapoor in the Telugu version. The film stars Neil Nitin Mukesh as the antagonist. Mandira Bedi, who is known for her grey roles on television, plays a negative role in the film as well.

Choreographer Vaibhavi Merchant filed two romantic songs; filming  began in Innsbruck, Austria, and included the House of Music, the city's trams, Finstertal in Kühtai and Adlers Hotel. Some scenes were filmed in the nearby town Seefeld. Romantic songs were filmed at the "Top of Tyrol" viewing platform on Stubai Glacier,  Restaurant ice Q in Sölden, Swarovski Crystal Worlds and the suspension bridge Highline179 at Reutte in the Tyrol region. Some parts of one romantic song were filmed at Redbull's Hangar 7 at Salzburg Airport. Robinville and Creative Creatures were service producers for the Austria schedule.

Music 

The songs in Saaho were composed by Tanishk Bagchi, Guru Randhawa, Badshah, and Shankar–Ehsaan–Loy. The lyrics were written by Krishna Kanth and Sreejo in Telugu, Tanishk Bagchi, MellowD, Guru Randhawa, Badshah, and Manoj Yadav in Hindi, Vinayak Sasikumar in Malayalam, and Madhan Karky and Vignesh Shivan in Tamil. A bonus track Bang Bang (Saaho Bang) was released after the film's release.

Tracklist Telugu

Tracklist Hindi

Tracklist Tamil

Tracklist Malayalam

Marketing 
The first teaser poster featuring Prabhas from the film was revealed on his birthday, 22 October 2017; the poster received criticism, saying is similar to the poster of Blade Runner 2049. In July 2019, UV Creations announced the film's release date as 30 August 2019 in Telugu, Hindi, Tamil, and Malayalam.

Saaho – The Game, a First-person shooter mobile game was created by the Hyderabad-based company Pixalot Labs and was released on 15 August 2019.

Release 
Saaho was released on 30 August 2019 worldwide in Telugu, Hindi, and Tamil, along with a dubbed Malayalam version. The film was distributed by T-Series in North India while SPI Cinemas bought the distribution rights for Tamil Nadu. The film was internationally released by Yash Raj Films and Phars films.

Lawsuit 
Outshiny India, a luggage and bag manufacturer, filed a complaint and lawsuit against the director and multiple staff members for fraud and cheating at Madhapur police station. The manufacturers alleged the filmmakers defaulted on an expensive deal they signed with the manufacturer that mandated their product would be shown in the film.

Reception

Box office 
Saaho made  ($18.4 million) on its opening day worldwide, the second-highest ever for an Indian film, exceeding that of 2.0  ($16.6 million) but lower than Prabhas's previous film Baahubali 2: The Conclusion , which holds the record for the highest-opening Indian film. On day 10 Saaho exceeded  ($56.8 million).

Critical response 
The film received mixed to negative reviews from critics, who criticised the direction, writing and length, though the cast performances, visual effects, cinematography and action sequences received praise.

Anupama Chopra Film Companion said: "I know that a popcorn entertainer like Saaho isn't driven by logic or coherence. And I would have made my peace with it if the film delivered a good time. My biggest complaint is that it's a crashing bore. A lot of hard work has gone into creating the action and the extravagant sets. The budget is a reported 350 crores but for the viewer there's little bang for the buck."

Lakshana N Palat from India Today gave Saaho one-and-a-half stars out of five, calling it "a 350-crore disaster", and a "laboured and exhausting watch". She has added; "the saving grace of Saaho are the visuals and the high-octane action sequences", and that "the makers got so carried away with crafting action scenes and Prabhas' starry presence that they forgot about the story and character development midway".

Writing for The Times of India for the Tamil version, Thinkal Menon rated Saaho two-and-a-half stars out of five, praising the technical aspects but criticising the script. Menon stated the film was "largely dubbed in Tamil, leading to lip-sync issues". Taran Adarsh gave the film one-and-a-half stars out of five, commenting on its "weak story, confusing screenplay and amateur direction".

A reviewer for Bollywood Hungama gave Saaho two-and-a-half out of five, saying it "suffers from a lackadaisical script and a vacuous screenplay". Rajeev Masand of News18 gave the film one-and-a-half stars out of five; he praised Prabhas for his "enormous presence and unmistakable sincerity" but said the film has "all the depth and emotional wallop of a video game".

See also 
 List of multilingual Indian films
 Pan-Indian film
 List of longest films in India

Notes

References

External links 
 Saaho on UV Creations
 
 
 Saaho on Bollywood Hungama
 

2019 films
2019 action thriller films
2010s Hindi-language films
2010s Telugu-language films
UV Creations films
Indian action thriller films
Indian multilingual films
Films shot in Romania
Films scored by Mohamaad Ghibran
Films distributed by Yash Raj Films
Films shot in Austria
Films shot in Dubai
Films shot in Mumbai
Films shot in Abu Dhabi
Films shot in Europe
Films shot in Hyderabad, India
Films shot at Ramoji Film City
Indian films about revenge
IMAX films
2019 multilingual films
Films scored by Guru Randhawa
Films scored by Tanishk Bagchi
Films scored by Shankar–Ehsaan–Loy
Films scored by Badshah